Martin Hansen may refer to:

 Martin Hansen (boxer) (1925–1999), Danish Olympic boxer
 Martin Hansen (footballer) (born 1990), Danish football goalkeeper
 Martin A. Hansen (1909–1955), Danish author
 Martin Haldbo Hansen (born 1969), Danish rower
 Martin Lundgaard Hansen (born 1972), Danish badminton player
Martin Hansen, or Wunder (gamer) (born 1998), Danish professional gamer

See also
Martin Hanson (1923–1976), Australian politician
Martin Hansson (born 1971), Swedish football referee
Martin Hansson (skier) (born 1975), Swedish alpine skier